The Road is the unofficial name for the road that connects the villages of Saba, Netherlands, a Caribbean island. It is nicknamed as "The Road That Couldn't Be Built."

History 
After several engineers claimed that a road in Saba could not be built, Josephus Lambert Hassell (1906-1983), a Saban, along with the Saban people, began building the road in 1938. No machines were used during the creation of the road. In 1943, the first section of the road (between Fort Bay and The Bottom) was inaugurated. By 1958, The Road was finished.

Route 
There are no official documents about the exact route of The Road. After matching several sources, The Road is believed to go from Well's Bay Beach to Cove Bay Beach with a branch to Fort Bay after The Bottom, in the direction of Well's Bay Beach. The Road connects the island with the airport as well.

References 

Saba (island)
Roads in the Caribbean